The 2008 United States Senate election in New Jersey was held on November 4, 2008. Incumbent Democratic U.S. Senator Frank Lautenberg won re-election to a fifth, non-consecutive term, defeating former Republican congressman Dick Zimmer. Zimmer had also been the nominee for this seat in 1996.

Background 
In November 2006, Senator Lautenberg had the lowest approval rating of any Democrat running for re-election in 2008 (with 39% approving and 45% disapproving), with his approval improving only slightly to 42% as of September 2007. In the same September 2007 poll conducted by the Quinnipiac University Polling Institute, voters surveyed decided that Lautenberg does not deserve re-election (46% to 36%) and that he is too old to effectively serve another six years in the Senate (54% to 40%).

Poll results suggested that given the right formula, this could have been a surprise upset race in November 2008. "The poll shows that Sen. Frank Lautenberg, who many voters say is too old to run for another term, would be vulnerable to a strong Republican candidate next year," according to Quinnipiac pollster Clay Richards.

The first poll conducted after the primaries (Rasmussen Reports, June 4, 2008) showed a tighter than expected race between Lautenberg and Zimmer, with the two candidates in a virtual tie.

However, the prevailing political climate at the time of the election was also a major factor.  Voter anger was targeted against the GOP, and many Democrats once considered vulnerable managed to hold on.

Democratic primary

Candidates 
 Rob Andrews, U.S. Representative from Haddon Heights
 Donald Cresitello, Mayor of Morristown
 Frank Lautenberg, incumbent U.S. Senator

Polling

Results

Republican primary

Candidates 
 Joseph Pennacchio, State Senator from Rockaway Township
 Murray Sabrin, professor at Ramapo College and  perennial candidate
 Dick Zimmer, former U.S. Representative and nominee for the U.S. Senate in 1996

Withdrew
Anne Evans Estabrook, real estate developer
Andrew Unanue, former Goya Foods executive (endorsed Zimmer)

Declined
Kip Bateman, State Senator from Neshanic Station

Results 

Official results, New Jersey Division of Elections (PDF, July 11, 2008)

General election

Candidates

Major 
 Frank Lautenberg, incumbent U.S. Senator
 Dick Zimmer, former U.S. Representative

Minor 
 Jeff Boss (I)
 Daryl Mikell Brooks (I)
 J.M. Carter (I)
 Carl Peter Klapper (Write In)
 Sara Lobman (Socialist Workers)
 Jason Scheurer (Libertarian)

Debates 
On October 29, 2008, a debate between Lautenberg and Zimmer was held on the radio station NJ 101.5.

On November 1, 2008, the two candidates debated for the second time on New Jersey Network, in the only televised debate agreed to by the Lautenberg campaign.

Predictions

Polling

Results

See also 
 2008 United States Senate elections

References

External links 
 Division of Elections from the New Jersey Secretary of State
 U.S. Congress candidates for New Jersey at Project Vote Smart
 New Jersey, U.S. Senate from CQ Politics
 New Jersey U.S. Senate from OurCampaigns.com
 New Jersey U.S. Senate race from 2008 Race Tracker
 Campaign contributions from OpenSecrets
 Zimmer (R) vs Lautenberg (D-i) graph of multiple polls from Pollster.com
 Official campaign websites (Archived)
 Frank Lautenberg, Democratic nominee
 Dick Zimmer, Republican nominee
 Jason Scheurer, Libertarian candidate
 Daryl Mikell Brooks, Independent candidate

2008
New Jersey
United States Senate